is a Japanese voice actress from Kanagawa Prefecture, Japan. She was previously affiliated with Sigma Seven, but is currently associated with Stay Luck.

Biography

Filmography

Anime television series
Seraph of the End (2015), Fumie Hyakuya
Shomin Sample (2015), Karen Jinryō
Tantei Kageki Milky Holmes TD (2015), Harmony (White)
Anne Happy (2016), Timothy, Tsubaki Sayama
High School Fleet (2016), Thea Kruetzer
New Game! (2016), Umiko Ahagon
Rilu Rilu Fairilu (2016), Nameko
Tales of Zestiria the X (2016), Ganette
The Asterisk War Season 2 (2016), Flora Klemm
Ani ni Tsukeru Kusuri wa Nai! (2017), Myaomyao
New Game!! (2017), Umiko Ahagon
Aikatsu Stars! (2018), Merlion Carey
Pastel Memories (2019), Nejire Usagi
Sword Art Online Alternative: Gun Gale Online (2018), Milana Sidorova/Toma
Healin' Good Pretty Cure (2020), Emily Smith
Yu-Gi-Oh! Sevens (2020/2021/2022), Noodle Sorako, Finger Chikako, Sweets Kakako, Flash Umiko, Hire Yureko, Konvoy Sagawa
Iii Icecrin (2021), Chicchi
Yu-Gi-Oh! Go Rush!! (2022), Venus Ganiko
Legend of Mana: The Teardrop Crystal (2022), Sproutlings
The Tale of the Outcasts (2023), Maurie
Urusei Yatsura (2023), Ginger

Anime film
 High School Fleet: The Movie (2020), Thea Kruetzer

Video games
Ore ni Hatarakette Iwarete mo Tori (2016), Hartinia Cordouta
New Game!: The Challenge Stage! (2017), Umiko Ahagon
Azur Lane (2017), USS West Virginia (BB-48)
Alice Gear Aegis (2018), Meika Yorozuba, Mari Jingūji
Fate/Grand Order (2018), Bradamante
Samurai Shodown (2019), Shiki
Arknights (2019), Bena
Blue Archive (2021), Kawawa Shizuko
Gate of Nightmares (2021), Ronja, Silphy
Massage Freaks (2022), Momiji

References

External links
 Official agency profile 
 

Year of birth missing (living people)
Living people
Japanese video game actresses
Japanese voice actresses
Voice actresses from Kanagawa Prefecture
21st-century Japanese actresses